Hestiochora continentalis is a moth of the family Zygaenidae. It is found in Australia from southern Queensland through New South Wales to Victoria, South Australia and Western Australia.

The length of the forewings is 7.5–8.5 mm for males and 8.5–10 mm for females.

The larvae feed on Eucalyptus fasciculosa.

External links
Australian Faunal Directory
Zygaenid moths of Australia: a revision of the Australian Zygaenidae

Procridinae
Moths described in 2005